Patricio Di Palma (born 26 June 1971 in Buenos Aires) is an Argentine racing driver. He has run in different series, with major success in Turismo Carretera and TC 2000.

Career 
1992: Argentine Supercart Championship
1993: Argentine Supercart Championship
1994: Argentine Supercart Championship
1995: Turismo Carretera
1996: Turismo Carretera
1997: Turismo Carretera
1998: Turismo Carretera
1999: Turismo Carretera
2000: Turismo Carretera
2001: Turismo Carretera
2002: Turismo Carretera, TRV6.
2003: Turismo Carretera
2004: Turismo Carretera, TC2000
2005: Turismo Carretera, Turismo Nacional champion.
2006: Turismo Carretera
2007: TC2000 (Volkswagen Bora), Turismo Carretera, TRV6.
2008: Turismo Carretera

External links 
Official website of Patricio Di Palma

TC 2000 Championship drivers
1971 births
Living people
Turismo Carretera drivers
Top Race V6 drivers
Argentine racing drivers